Mitchley is a surname. Notable people with the surname include:

Cyril Mitchley (born 1938), South African cricketer, umpire and referee
Danny Mitchley (born 1989), British footballer